Neottia smallii (syn. Listera smallii), the kidneyleaf twayblade or Appalachian twayblade, is a species of terrestrial orchid found in the eastern United States. It occurs in the Appalachian Mountains from northern New Jersey to northeastern Georgia.

References 

smallii
Plants described in 1899
Flora of the Eastern United States
Orchids of the United States